Carambola! (also known as Strange Adventures of Coby and Ben) is a 1974 Italian comedic Spaghetti Western film co-written and directed by Ferdinando Baldi. It was the first film starring the duo Michael Coby and Paul L. Smith, a couple formed by producer Manolo Bolognini with the purpose of ripping off the successful films of the duo Bud Spencer-Terence Hill.

Plot
A former soldier and champion of pool and his gigantic and irascible friend accepted, for $50.000, to investigate arms trafficking that would take place between the US and Mexico. The two devise a trick.

Cast 

Michael Coby as Coby
Paul L. Smith as Clem Rodovam
William Bogart as  Kelly for 50
Horst Frank as  Clydeson
Pino Ferrara as Sheriff
Luciano Catenacci as Cpt. Howard Johnson 
Melissa Chimenti as Pamela 
Franco Fantasia as  Professor 
Ignazio Spalla as  Mexican Leader 
Nello Pazzafini as Clydeson's Henchman
Pietro Torrisi as  Murdered Warden

See also 
 List of Italian films of 1974

References

External links

1970s buddy comedy films
1970s Western (genre) comedy films
Films directed by Ferdinando Baldi
Italian buddy comedy films
Spaghetti Western films
1970s Italian-language films
1974 films
1970s Italian films